Phagun is a 1958 Indian Hindi-language film directed and produced by Bibhuti Mitra and written by Pranab Roy. The film stars Madhubala and Bharat Bhushan in leading roles, and its score is by O. P. Nayyar.

A romantic musical, Phagun revolves around Bijan, a zamindar's son who falls in love with a dancer named Banani. They are not able to marry each other due to social differences in their lifetime and are reincarnated to complete their incomplete love tale.

Upon its release, Phagun was not well-received by critics, who panned it for its story and direction; but the film proved to be very popular among the audience as well as one of the top-grossing hits of 1958.

Plot
The new owners of Deepak Mahal meet with its caretaker, Mattu (Dhumal), who narrates the story of its former owners: Bijondra (Bharat Bhushan) - the only child of a wealthy Hindu Brahmin Zamindar; and Banani (Madhubala) – the only child of a single father, Banjara Sardar Tinkari (Murad). Starting with the move to evict the Banjaras from his father's property, flute-playing Bijondra meets and falls in love with pretty dancer Banani – leading to being asked to leave by his enraged father; while Banani's father plans her marriage to Banjara Madhal (Jeevan). After many difficulties and contrasting situations, they marry each other but die soon.

Cast
Madhubala as Banani
Bharat Bhushan as Bijandra 'Bijan'
Jeevan as Madhal
Nishi as Jharna
Dhumal as Mattu
Mehmood as Gatekeeper
Murad as Tinkari
Badri Prasad as Bijan's Father
Cuckoo as dancer
Kammo as dancer

Music
Lyrics by Qamar Jalalabadi. The music of the movie is composed by O. P. Nayyar. It has a popular song "Ek Pardesi Mera Dil Le Gaya". The soundtrack became popular at the film release. All songs were sung by Asha Bhosle.

Reception

Box office 
Phagun was the sixth highest-grossing film of 1958. It grossed ₹1.4 crore, including a net of ₹0.7 crore.

1958 was a very successful year for Madhubala, as she had four major critical and commercial successes in this year: Chalti Ka Naam Gaadi, Howrah Bridge, Phagun and Kala Pani.

Critical reception 
Phagun opened to mixed reviews , with the music receiving the most praise. Saiam Z. U. stated that the film's story was a "predictable fare", although it was "engaging". She found the music to be "superb" and melodious. Khatijia Akbar explained that Phagun was a success only due to its musical score, and the film had "little substance". A retrospective review by Volterra observed in the film that Madhubala "expresses a wide range of passion [in the role of a dancer]" and compared her performance to that of Hollywood actress Elizabeth Taylor in Cleopatra (1963).

References

External links
 

1958 films
1950s Hindi-language films
1950s romance films
Films scored by O. P. Nayyar
Indian romance films
Hindi-language romance films